Rolv Hellesylt (born 26 September 1927) is a Norwegian judge. He was born in Sunnylven, and graduated with the cand.jur. degree in 1956. He then spent one year at New York University. He was hired in the Ministry of Justice and the Police in 1959, and was promoted to assisting secretary in 1969. He was then a city lawyer in Oslo from 1976 to 1979, before serving as a Supreme Court Justice from 1979 to 1997. He lives at Høvik.

References

1927 births
Living people
Supreme Court of Norway justices
Norwegian civil servants
People from Møre og Romsdal
Norwegian expatriates in the United States